This is a List of National Historic Landmarks in Maryland.  There are currently 76 National Historic Landmarks (NHLs) in Maryland.  Also included are short lists of former NHLs and of other historic sites of national importance administered by the National Park Service.

Current NHLs

The NHLs are distributed over 17 of Maryland's 23 counties and its one county-equivalent, the independent city of Baltimore.

For consistency, places are listed by their National Historic Landmark program names.

|}

Historic areas of the NPS in Maryland
National Historical Parks, some National Monuments, and certain other areas listed in the National Park system are historic landmarks of national importance that are highly protected already, often before the inauguration of the NHL program in 1960, and are then often not also named NHLs per se. The National Park Service lists these together with the NHLs in the state.

The Clara Barton National Historic Site, Monocacy National Battlefield and Thomas Stone National Historic Site are also NHLs and are listed above (with the latter under its alternative name, Habre de Venture).

Former National Historic Landmarks 
There is one former NHL, Resurrection Manor, which was demolished in 2002 and subsequently delisted.

See also
National Register of Historic Places listings in Maryland
List of National Historic Landmarks by state

References

External links

 National Historic Landmarks Program, at National Park Service
 National Register Information System, National Park Service.
 Maryland Historical Markers photographs at the University of Maryland Libraries 

Maryland
 
National Historic Landmarks
National Historic Landmarks